The 1941–42 season was the 3rd year of wartime football by Rangers.

Results
All results are written with Rangers' score first.

Southern League

Southern League Cup

Summer Cup

See also
 1941–42 in Scottish football
 1941–42 Southern League Cup (Scotland)

Rangers F.C. seasons
Rangers
Scottish football championship-winning seasons